The striped goby (Gobius vittatus) is a species of goby native to the Mediterranean Sea where it occurs on coralline grounds at depths of from  though normally not deeper than .  This species can reach a length of  SL.  This species can also be found in the aquarium trade.

References

striped goby
Fish of the Mediterranean Sea
striped goby